Daxing is a town in Yaohai District, Anhui, China. , it has 10 residential communities under its administration.

References

Towns in Anhui
Hefei